Abdel-Hakim Abdallah (born 18 August 1997) is a professional footballer who plays for  club Rodez and the Comoros national football team as a defender.

Club career
Abdallah made his professional debut with Troyes AC in a 1–0 Ligue 2 loss to Stade Lavallois on 20 January 2017.

On 11 July 2022, Abdallah signed a three-year contract with Rodez.

International career
Abdallah made his debut for the Comoros national football team in a 0–0 friendly tie with Mauritania on 6 October 2017.

References

External links

Living people
1997 births
Sportspeople from Troyes
Association football defenders
Citizens of Comoros through descent
Comorian footballers
Comoros international footballers
French footballers
French sportspeople of Comorian descent
Ligue 2 players
Championnat National players
Championnat National 2 players
Championnat National 3 players
ES Troyes AC players
Tours FC players
Grenoble Foot 38 players
Rodez AF players
Footballers from Grand Est